Harvey Thriller was a comic book imprint used by Harvey Comics for their brief foray into publishing super heroes and other non-'kiddie' comics in the mid-1960s. Overseen by Joe Simon, all the titles featured work by many well-known creators, including Jack Kirby, Bob Powell, Wally Wood, Otto Binder, and the earliest known work by Jim Steranko.

History

Thrill Adventure 
While Harvey Comics has for decades been known for their many kids' comics, such as Casper the Friendly Ghost, Richie Rich, etc., they have published other kinds of comics over the years. From 1955 to 1962, most of their non-kid comic output was done under the "Thrill Adventure" line, under the editorship of Joe Simon, after which they stopped publishing any non-kid comics.

Harvey Thriller 
In the mid-1960s, with the camp craze created by the Batman television series, Harvey approached Joe Simon again to oversee a new line of comics, mainly superheroes, but with science fiction/fantasy stories thrown in as well. They also continued the Thrill Adventures title Warfront, after a 7-year hiatus.

The line started off with one-shots Unearthly Spectaculars #1, Thrill-O-Rama #1, Blast-Off #1, and Warfront #36 in October  1965, using work that was apparently done for the 1950s Thrill Adventure line.  The next issues did not come out until almost a year later in September 1966. Along with the new titles were two reprint titles for Fighting American and The Spirit, which did include new stories for these characters.

The line was unsuccessful, and all of the titles ended abruptly with the March 1967 issues. House ads showed the covers for Jigsaw #3 and Thrill-O-Rama #3, but those issues were never published.

Titles published

Thrill Adventure 
Alarming Adventures (1962–63) #1-3 (sf/fantasy)
Alarming Tales (1957–58) #1-6 (sf/suspense)
Black Cat Western (1955) #54-56
Black Cat Mystery (1956) #57
Black Cat Mystic (1956–58) #58-62
Chamber of Clues (1955) #27-28 (detective)
Man in Black (1957–58) #1-4 issues
Race for the Moon (1958) #1-3 issues (intro 3 Rocketeers in #3)
Thrills of Tomorrow (1955) #19-20 (Stuntman, Boy Explorers reprints)
Warfront (1955–1958) #26-35
Western Tales (1955–56) #31-33
Witches Western Tales (1955) #29-30

Harvey Thriller 
Blast Off (1965) #1 (3 Rocketeers, stuff intended for Race for the Moon #4)
Double-Dare Adventures (1966–67) 2 issues (Bee-man, Glowing Gladiator, Magic Master)
Fighting American (1966) 1 issue
Jigsaw (1966) 2 issues
Spirit (1966–67) 2 issues
Spyman (1966–67) 3 issues
Thrill-O-Rama (1965–66) 3 issues (Man in Black-Fate, Pirana #2-on)
Unearthly Spectaculars (1965–67) 3 issues (Tiger Boy, Jack Q Frost, 3 Rocketeers, Miracles, Inc, Earthman)
Warfront (1965–67) #36-39 (Dynamite Joe, Lone Tiger in 2nd issue)

Harvey Thriller characters
 Bee-Man
 Captain 3-D (owned by Simon and Kirby)
 Dynamite Joe the Blast Crazy Marine (owned by Joe Simon)
 Fighting American (owned by Joe Simon)
 Glowing Gladiator
 Jack Q. Frost
 Jigsaw (owned by Joe Simon)
 Magicmaster
 Man in Black
 Miracles, Inc
 Pirana (owned by Joe Simon)
 Spyman (owned by Joe Simon)
 Tiger Boy (owned by Joe Simon)
 3 Rocketeers (owned by Joe Simon)

References

External links
Comic Book Artist #13 Issue devoted to Harvey Comics, including Harvey Thriller.

Harvey Comics
Comic book imprints
1965 establishments in New York City